The Chris Farley Show was a sketch from the American comedy TV series Saturday Night Live, which involved comic actor Chris Farley, as a parody of himself, interviewing various celebrities. Rather than ask his guest questions that had any popular significance, or allow his guest to plug a current project, he would invariably act nervously, and simply describe scenes from a film in which the guest actor appeared (or occasionally films that had nothing to do with the guest). After asking the performer whether he remembered this particular event, Farley would relate, "That was awesome." Other times, he would ask questions that were of little relevance, or made no sense at all. Invariably, he would say something he regretted and would smack his head and call himself an idiot. The sketch accentuated Farley's shyness for comic effect.

Sketches

Jeff Daniels
Jeff Daniels was the first guest of The Chris Farley Show when it premiered on October 5, 1991. Daniels was appearing to promote his newest movie, The Butcher's Wife. Daniels gives mostly yes or no answers to Farley's questions regarding whether or not he remembers certain scenes of movies. The episode also features a question from a caller, who mimics Farley's "d'you remember" questions. Eventually, Farley and the caller ignore Jeff Daniels and reminisce about the previous episode, in which the same caller asked Arnold Schwarzenegger a question.

Martin Scorsese
Martin Scorsese was the second guest on the show. Originally aired on November 16, 1991, Scorsese appeared to promote his film Cape Fear. As with the first sketch, Farley introduces himself, stumbles over his words, and eventually discusses action movies with his guest before taking a caller. The caller asks Scorsese a question germane to filmmaking, but Farley remarks she called in before, on an unseen show where he interviewed Bruce Willis. The conversation steers back to action films, in this case a minor scene from Die Hard, where Farley was impressed that John McClane had to make his way across a floor full of broken glass without shoes.

Paul McCartney
In the third and final Chris Farley Show sketch aired on February 13, 1993, Paul McCartney, that night's musical guest, was the guest on Farley's show. Farley acted awestruck and giddy in the former Beatle's presence, repeatedly asking ridiculous questions, typically starting with "Do you remember when you were in The Beatles?" or "That was a hoax, right?" in reference to rumors of McCartney's death, to which he gives one (or few) word answers. Farley attempts a serious question, asking about when the singer was arrested at Narita Airport for possession of marijuana, while McCartney replies he is ashamed and sensitive about that incident. Farley then says "I am so stupid!", and McCartney consoles him that being in show business he must face up to it, as he was asked the same question by Maria Shriver earlier. Farley then trails off, saying Shriver is married to Arnold Schwarzenegger, then asks, "Did you see Terminator?" This is the only Chris Farley Show sketch not to feature a guest caller, and as the scene fades out, Farley is conversing with McCartney recommending the Schwarzenegger film.

Biography title
A biographical novel named after the sketch, The Chris Farley Show: A Biography in Three Acts was released on May 6, 2008, and was co-written by Tom Farley, Jr. (Chris Farley's brother) and Tanner Colby. It features anecdotes by his friends and family. The novel was named Amazon Best of the Month by Amazon.com in May, 2008. Co-author Colby is also credited with co-writing John Belushi's biography, Belushi: A Biography. Farley was notorious for following in the footsteps of Belushi, both dying at age 33 from drug-related heart attacks.

See also
 Recurring Saturday Night Live characters and sketches

External links
Chris Farley Show transcript - Paul McCartney interview
Official Website for A Biography in Three Acts
Martin Scorsese video clip
Jeff Daniels video clip
Paul McCartney video clip
Chris Rock interview

Saturday Night Live sketches
Saturday Night Live in the 1990s